Tveit is a former municipality that was located in the old Vest-Agder county in Norway.  The  municipality existed from 1838 until its dissolution in 1965.  The municipality was located in the eastern part of the present-day municipality of Kristiansand along the river Topdalselva. The administrative centre of the municipality was the village of Tveit where Tveit Church is located.

History
The parish of Tveit was established as a municipality on 1 January 1838 (see formannskapsdistrikt law). During the 1960s, there were many municipal mergers across Norway due to the work of the Schei Committee. On 1 January 1965, the municipalities of Tveit (population: 2,802), Oddernes (population: 18,668), and Randesund (population: 1,672) were merged with the town of Kristiansand (population: 27,100) to form a new, larger municipality of Kristiansand.

Name
The municipality (originally the parish) was named after the old Tveit farm, since the first Tveit Church was built there. The name is identical with the word  which means "a piece of cleared land cut from a forest".  The name spelled differently over the centuries: Tved, Thvet, and Tveid.

Government
All municipalities in Norway, including Tveit, are responsible for primary education (through 10th grade), outpatient health services, senior citizen services, unemployment and other social services, zoning, economic development, and municipal roads.  The municipality was governed by a municipal council of elected representatives, which in turn elected a mayor.

Municipal council
The municipal council  of Tveit was made up of representatives that were elected to four year terms.  The party breakdown of the final municipal council was as follows:

See also
List of former municipalities of Norway

References

Kristiansand
Former municipalities of Norway
1838 establishments in Norway
1965 disestablishments in Norway